The Zolotoy Bridge ( - Golden Bridge) is a cable-stayed bridge across the Zolotoy Rog (Golden Horn Bay) in Vladivostok, Russia. The Zolotoy Rog Bridge was one of two bridges, along with the Russky Island Bridge, built in preparation for the 2012 APEC summit. The bridge was commissioned by the city of Vladivostok in 2006. Construction of the bridge began on July 25, 2008, and the bridge was officially opened on August 11, 2012. It is considered the world's 14th longest cable-stayed bridge. This bridge over Golden Horn Bay made it possible to travel from the centre of Vladivostok to the remote Churkin Cape in only 5–10 minutes instead of the usual 1.5–2 hours.

See also

Golden Bridge (disambiguation)
Russky Bridge
List of tallest bridges in the world
List of largest cable-stayed bridges

References 

Bridges completed in 2012
Buildings and structures in Vladivostok
Transport in Vladivostok
Cable-stayed bridges in Russia
2012 establishments in Russia
Road bridges in Russia
Pacific Coast of Russia
Cross-sea bridges in Asia